Sux may refer to:

 Sioux Gateway Airport, IATA and FAA code
 Sumerian language, ISO 639-3 code
 Suxamethonium chloride, an anesthetic medication

See also
Suck (disambiguation)